A pedestrian scramble, also known as scramble intersection and scramble corner (Canada), 'X' Crossing (UK), diagonal crossing (US),  (Japan), exclusive pedestrian interval, or Barnes Dance, is a type of traffic signal movement that temporarily stops all vehicular traffic, thereby allowing pedestrians to cross an intersection in every direction, including diagonally, at the same time.

It was first used in Canada and the United States in the late 1940s, but it later fell out of favor with traffic engineers there, as it was seen as prioritizing flow of pedestrians over flow of car traffic. Its benefits for pedestrian amenity and safety have led to new examples being installed in many countries in recent years, including the world's busiest pedestrian intersection at Shibuya, Tokyo.

Development

The name "Barnes Dance" commemorates traffic engineer Henry Barnes while alluding to a barn dance. While he did not claim to have invented it himself, Barnes was a strong advocate of it, having observed the difficulties his daughter experienced on her way to school. He first introduced it in his home city of Denver, Colorado in the late 1940s. Around this time, the pedestrian scramble was being tested separately in Kansas City and Vancouver. Barnes later brought it to Baltimore and New York City. When Barnes became traffic commissioner of New York City in 1962, his first action was to look for intersections to implement pedestrian scrambles. The first pedestrian scramble was installed ten days after he took office at the intersection of Vanderbilt Avenue and 42nd Street, to great acclaim. Following the success of this first scramble, Barnes began adding more scrambles across the city, at Wall Street; 42nd Street at Fifth Avenue and at Madison Avenue; and Brooklyn.

In his autobiography The Man With the Red and Green Eyes (1965) Barnes recorded that a City Hall reporter, John Buchanan, coined the phrase by writing that "Barnes has made the people so happy they're dancing in the streets." Barnes later said, "As things stood now, a downtown shopper needed a four-leaf clover, a voodoo charm, and a St. Christopher's medal to make it in one piece from one curbstone to the other. As far as I was concerned—a traffic engineer with Methodist leanings—I didn't think that the Almighty should be bothered with problems which we, ourselves, were capable of solving."

However, the Barnes Dance—officially known as an "exclusive pedestrian interval" because vehicular traffic is stopped in all directions during a pedestrian scramble—caused gridlock in some cities where it was implemented, such as New York City, where congestion increased due to longer wait times for lights. Robert Moses disliked the scrambles because they held up traffic. In locations such as Washington, D.C., pedestrian scrambles shorten the time allotted to each traffic-signal phase by one-third. One study of exclusive pedestrian intervals in Greenwich, Connecticut, found that it offered no extra benefits compared to a "concurrent pedestrian interval" where pedestrians cross when parallel traffic has the green light. In the United States, the 2009 Manual on Uniform Traffic Control Devices allows pedestrian scrambles.

Application

In Australia
In Adelaide, there are two scrambles on either end of Rundle Mall, King William Street and another on Pulteney Street. There is another crossing at the intersection of King William Street, Waymouth Street and Pirie Street.

In Brisbane, there are two noteworthy scrambles: one in the central business district at the intersection of Adelaide and Edward Streets, adjacent to the Queen Street Mall; and a second at the intersection of Vulture and Boundary Streets in the suburb of West End.

In Darwin, there is a pedestrian scramble at the CBD end of Smith St Mall.

In Melbourne, there is a pedestrian scramble at the intersection of Flinders and Elizabeth Streets, in front of Flinders Street railway station, allowing pedestrians to walk directly to the station and the two island tram platforms in the middle of both streets. Also, since 2019 there is a four-way scramble at the intersection of Wellington St and Charles St in Kew (due to school pedestrian traffic through this intersection). A third scramble is located at the intersection of Irving and Leeds Streets, Footscray, next to Footscray Station.

in Albury, there is a long-standing 4-way scramble on the busiest CBD intersection, Dean St and Kiewa St.

In Perth, pedestrian scrambles are mostly found in the CBD shopping area (the intersections between two of Barrack, Hay, Murray and William Streets. They are also found at the CBD intersections of St Georges Terrace, Mount and Milligan Streets and where St Georges changes to Adelaide Terrace at Victoria Avenue). The inner suburb of Mount Lawley also has a set where Beaufort Street intersects Walcott Street as well as Leederville at the intersection of Oxford and Vincent Streets.

In Sydney, there are numerous examples in built-up commercial and CBD areas, like the intersection of George and Druitt Streets (with one of the corner blocks being the Sydney Town Hall), Oxford Street and Bourke Street in Darlinghurst, Church Street in Parramatta also has them, as do the Penrith and Fairfield central business districts.

In Canada 

Vancouver was one of the first cities worldwide to use the concept at individual locations. London, Ontario, had a Barnes' Dance crosswalk in the 1960s at the intersection of Clarence and King streets. In Toronto, the intersection of Yonge Street and Dundas Street, the location of Yonge-Dundas Square, has the city's first installed scramble intersection and has since been joined by two more on Bloor Street at Yonge and Bay Streets in the downtown area. In 2015, Toronto has eliminated the Bay and Bloor scramble crossing after an evaluation study found 'modest positive benefits for pedestrians' and 'negative impacts to vehicular traffic'. The staff report also noted that sideswipe collisions at Bay and Bloor have more than doubled and rear-end type crashes have increased by 50% “likely due to increased driver frustration”. Kingston, Ontario, has a scramble crosswalk at the corners of Union Street and University Avenue to increase the safety of Queen's University students. Calgary has two pedestrian scrambles in the Eau Claire neighbourhood. St. Albert, Alberta, has installed a test pedestrian scramble as of the end of May 2017. Edmonton has four as part of a pilot project, with plans for a fifth by early December. Quebec City and Banff also have a few pedestrian scramble intersections. Many intersections in Montreal, especially near downtown, activate the walk signal in all four directions at the same time, effectively creating pedestrian scrambles.

In China 
Shanghai as of 2018, has 11 major intersections equipped with pedestrian scrambles across the city in busy commercial areas. Beijing opened its first pedestrian scramble at the intersection of Lugu West Street and Zhengda Road in 2018. Two pedestrian scrambles opened in Haikou in 2019. Guangzhou has two pedestrian scrambles as of 2019. Pedestrian scrambles also exist in Hangzhou, Shenzhen, Changzhou, Nantong and Yichang. Hong Kong has numerous intersections operating with an exclusive pedestrian interval but not timed for the longer diagonal crossings and are not marked as such. Diagonal crossing at these de facto scramble crossings is illegal in Hong Kong.

In Japan

Japan's largest, and most famous, scramble crossing is found in Tokyo, outside Shibuya station, which was inaugurated in 1973. Over 3,000 pedestrians can cross in one scramble and has become a symbol of Tokyo and Japan as a whole. Sukiyabashi in Ginza is another large scramble crossing in Tokyo.

Kansai also has many pedestrian scrambles, including four outside the north exit of Kyoto Station alone. Most of the diagonal crossings in Osaka are located in the south of the city, in Abeno ward.

The first pedestrian scramble to be installed in Japan was in the Kyushu city of Kumamoto in 1969.

In Luxembourg 
In the southern town of Dudelange, there is a pedestrian scramble at the busy intersection of the route de Kayl, route de Luxembourg and rue Gaffelt.

In Mexico 
In Downtown Tijuana diagonal pedestrian crossing with its own signal in the cycle has been applied at numerous intersections for decades. Currently the symbol to indicate pedestrian scramble is possible is a ribbon. In 2019 Mexico City installed its first pedestrian scramble in the Historic Center (Centro Histórico).

In the Netherlands
In the Netherlands, a version of this crossing, called a Simultaneous Green light for Bicyclists, combined with an all way green light for pedestrians, is currently being used in a number of intersections in the North and East of the Netherlands.

In New Zealand
In New Zealand, the first Barnes Dance was introduced in 1958 on Queen Street, Auckland, and was soon found in other cities as well.  The Queen Street examples are Custom Street, Shortland, Wyndham, Victoria and Wellesley Street intersections. When Mayoral Drive was constructed in the 1970s it was not created as a Barnes Dance -indicative of a change in traffic management models.

The Queen Street crossings remain today, despite early 2000s attempts to remove them for greater car priority, and have been extended with greater numbers of phases and pedestrian green times during the late 2000s.

Additionally, some Barnes Dance intersections do not provide painted crossings and are therefore de facto, such as the intersection of Grafton Rd and Symonds St within the University of Auckland city campus. Karangahape Road had two such crossings – the Queen Street / K Road intersection was modified in the 1990s but the Pitt Street / K Road intersection is still a Barnes Dance. On nearby Ponsonby Road there is a Barnes Dance at Franklin Road. There is a Barnes Dance on the Great North Road at the Surrey Crescent intersection with Williamson Avenue. There is also a Barnes Dance at the multiple street intersection of Lake Road, Hurstmere Road, Northcroft Street and The Strand in Takapuna.

Barnes Dances also existed in several other cities in New Zealand, notably on Colombo Street, Christchurch and at Cargill's Corner in South Dunedin, but have been gradually phased out.  Barnes Dances exist in the South Island on Stafford Street in Timaru and three in the Christchurch CBD. In Dunedin Barnes Dances were reintroduced early in 2018, with the first two of ten sites (on the Octagon's junctions with Princes and George Streets) opened in March.

In the Philippines 
In Taguig, there are two known pedestrian scrambles both in Bonifacio Global City: at the intersection of 30th Street and 3rd Avenue, and at the intersection of McKinley Parkway and 26th Street.

In Sweden 
In October 2020, the first diagonal crossing in Stockholm was opened at the intersection of Mäster Samuelsgatan and Regeringsgatan.

In Taiwan 

In the 1990s, the first pedestrian scramble was implemented at the Qingdao West Road and Gongyuan Road intersection in Zhongzheng District of Taipei by the Taipei City Government. Subsequently, more cities have applied pedestrian scrambles to important intersections and downtown areas in Taiwan, including in New Taipei City, Taoyuan, Taichung, Tainan, Kaohsiung, Keelung, Hsinchu, Chiayi City and Yilan County.

In the United Kingdom 

The first formal diagonal crossing in the UK was opened in Balham town centre in 2005. The success of the Balham crossing was followed by conversion of the existing crossing facilities at Oxford Circus in 2009. Further diagonal crossings were constructed in Wood Green in 2010 and Wimbledon in 2012. Swansea opened a diagonal crossing in 2015.

In the United States
Kansas City was one of the first cities that used a pedestrian scramble system at a few locations. Denver formerly used the pedestrian scramble system at nearly every intersection in the downtown business district. The practice was eliminated in 2011, in order to "balance" resources allotted to pedestrians, vehicles, and mass transit. Exclusive pedestrian intervals were kept, but the diagonal crossing was made illegal.

In Boston, most signalized intersections use an exclusive pedestrian phase, where vehicular traffic is stopped in all directions and it is possible for fast walkers to cross the street diagonally (even though the crosswalks are not marked as such). However, a growing number of traffic signals are being programmed to use a concurrent pedestrian phase. A similar situation exists in Cambridge, Massachusetts, where intersections with exclusive intervals can allow fast walkers to cross the street diagonally.

In Washington, D.C., diagonal crossing existed at several downtown intersections until the mid-1980s. It was tried again on an experimental basis at 7th and H streets Northwest in the Chinatown neighborhood beginning May 2010. In 2017, a second Barnes Dance crosswalk was added at Irving and 14th streets Northwest.

In New Haven, all of the intersections with traffic lights have implemented the pedestrian scramble, since at least 1974.

In New York City, there were 635 intersections with exclusive pedestrian phases , although the majority were "T-away" intersections (T-intersections where the cross street takes traffic away from the intersection) and mid-block crossings, where a pedestrian scramble was one of the two phases. Many of the remaining 86 intersections with pedestrian scrambles are located where intersection geometry is skewed, requiring diagonal crossings from pedestrians and/or an exclusive pedestrian phase due to conflicts with vehicular traffic. Major pedestrian scrambles include the intersection of Vesey Street, Broadway, Park Row, and Ann Street in Lower Manhattan, as well as Nostrand Avenue and Flatbush Avenue in Midwood, Brooklyn.

Signals at several intersections in Pittsburgh, including along Craig Street at Centre Avenue, Bayard Street, Fifth Avenue, and Forbes Avenue near the University of Pittsburgh; on Forbes at Morewood Street at the main entrance to  Carnegie Mellon University; and on Forbes at Murray and Shady Avenues in Squirrel Hill stop traffic from all directions and allow pedestrians to cross in all directions.  They are not, however, specially signed; they use a standard pedestrian crossing light (with added audio signal for the visually impaired).

The signal at the intersection of McKinley and Riverside Avenues on the campus of Ball State University in Muncie, Indiana, is called the "Scramble Light" and is identified by the university as a campus landmark.

Athens, Ohio, has one diagonal crosswalk still in place (as of May 2022) at the intersection of Court and Union Streets in Uptown, near the Ohio University campus.

Some pedestrian scrambles are implemented only  temporarily, during times when extremely high pedestrian traffic is expected. A notable example of this occurs on home-game Saturdays at the intersection of Main Street and Stadium Boulevard in Ann Arbor, Michigan, which is immediately adjacent to Michigan Stadium. Local police take control of the vehicular signals and indicate the pedestrian phase by playing Michigan's fight song, "The Victors."

The city of Honolulu on the island of Oahu in the state of Hawaii has installed multiple pedestrian scramble crossings in the Waikīkī neighborhood. There are at least three of these intersections along Kalakaua Avenue at Lewers St, Royal Hawaiian Avenue and Seaside Avenue.

On 31 May 2013, Chicago began testing a pedestrian scramble on the intersection of State Street and Jackson Boulevard. It is now permanent.

In Nevada, both Reno and Sparks have pedestrian scramble interchanges.  Reno's is at the intersection of Virginia and 2nd Avenue downtown to accommodate casino pedestrian traffic, and Sparks' are along Victorian Avenue to assist people in crossing to festivals that are held along that street.

Seattle uses the pedestrian scramble at 1st and Pike, 1st and University, 1st and Cherry, Beacon and 15th, 15th Ave NE and NE 40th St, and at the West Seattle Junction.  The intersections are marked with a sign labeled  "All Way Walk." Bellevue, Washington, also has one at 108th Avenue NE and the NE 6th Street pedestrian walkway, on the west side of Bellevue Transit Center. It is not signed as an all-way walk, but has pedestrian walk lights, and is accompanied by an auditory alert of "Walk sign is on for all crossings."

In California, San Francisco has several pedestrian scrambles along Stockton Street in Chinatown, Montgomery Street in the Financial District, as well as in several other locations. In Los Angeles County, California, pedestrian scrambles are used in the Rodeo Drive commercial area of Beverly Hills; at the intersection of Westwood Boulevard and Le Conte Avenue as well as Weyburn and Broxton Avenues in the Westwood section of Los Angeles immediately adjacent to the UCLA campus; at the intersection of Hollywood Boulevard and Highland Avenue in Hollywood, and at the intersection of Jefferson Boulevard and McClintock Avenue near the University of Southern California. In the city of Santa Monica, 12 scramble crosswalks have been established in May 2016. In 1994, two scrambles were installed in Pasadena, Los Angeles County, along Colorado Boulevard at two intersections: at DeLacey Avenue and at Raymond Avenue. In San Diego, one of the locations that uses pedestrian scrambles is at the intersection of Market Street and 5th Avenue, but the city does not plan to add any additional scrambles. Carlsbad added its first scramble in 2012, and the campus of UC Davis installed a bike/pedestrian scramble near its recreation center in 2014.

The City of El Paso, Texas, added pedestrian scramble markings to the intersection of Santa Fe Street and Main Drive in Downtown in April 2015.

In Portland, Oregon, a pedestrian scramble was added in November 2015 to the intersection of NW 11th Avenue and NW Couch Street, near Powell's Books.

Multiple pedestrian scrambles were added in the downtown area of Broadway in Nashville, Tennessee, in March 2016.

In 2019, a pedestrian scramble was added in the downtown area of Prescott, Arizona known as Whiskey Row.

A pedestrian scramble was opened at the intersection of 8th St and Brickell Ave in the Brickell neighborhood of Miami in 2022

Advantages and disadvantages 

Research at Transport for London has suggested the installation of a diagonal crossing can reduce pedestrian casualties by 38%.

Since it stops all motor vehicles rather than allowing partial vehicle movements to coexist with partial pedestrian movements, the pedestrian scramble has sometimes been seen as inefficient by traffic engineers, with its removal believed to yield big savings in delays and congestion. It benefits drivers by eliminating concurrent pedestrian phases, allowing car traffic to make left or right turns without being blocked by pedestrians in the crossing. However, this also results in either longer wait times for both drivers and pedestrians, or shorter traffic-signal phases where less traffic could flow through an intersection in a single cycle.

Proper use requires that both drivers and pedestrians are aware of the traffic rules at such intersections. In some countries, that has led to a removal of at least individual installations. However, critics have dismissed these moves as further subordinating pedestrians to cars and consider the shared turns of motor vehicles and pedestrians as unnecessarily intimidating.

The pedestrian scramble may be used where large numbers of pedestrians are expected, and they will also have enough space to gather on the sidewalks in larger numbers. Under certain circumstances, pedestrian scrambles could reduce safety, as the average waiting times for pedestrians and car drivers are increased, thus creating more likelihood of people disobeying the signals.

See also
 Pelican crossing
 Traffic light

References

External links

 Time-lapse video of scramble intersection at Yonge and Dundas, Toronto

Pedestrian crossing components
Road transport
Traffic law
Transportation engineering